Chashchinskaya is a rural locality (a village) in Nikolskoye Rural Settlement of Shenkursky District, Arkhangelsk Oblast, Russia. The population was 80 as of 2010. There is 1 street.

Geography 
Chashchinskaya is located 7 km west of Shenkursk (the district's administrative centre) by road. Shipunovskaya is the nearest rural locality.

References 

Rural localities in Shenkursky District